Juventude CDU is the youth wing of the Unitary Democratic Coalition (CDU) in Portugal. Juventude CDU consists of the Portuguese Communist Youth (JCP) and Ecolojovem and develops political work in youth-related subjects, along with youth-oriented activities, primarily during electoral campaigns.

Portuguese Communist Party
Youth wings of political parties in Portugal